Wallenbergare is a Swedish dish generally consisting of ground veal, cream, egg yolks and coated in breadcrumbs. It is traditionally served with boiled or mashed potatoes, lingonberry jam and green peas.

There are various theories about the origin of this recipe. Credit is generally given to Julius Carlsson  (1898-1976), chef de cuisine at the restaurant Cecil on Norrmalm in Stockholm. The dish according to some was named after banker Marcus Wallenberg, Sr. (1864–1943) or his wife Amalia Wallenberg (1890–1943), daughter of  cookbook author Charles Emil Hagdahl (1809-1897).

See also
 List of veal dishes

References

Wallenberg family
Swedish cuisine
Veal dishes